Love Changes Everything - The Andrew Lloyd Webber Collection, Volume 2 (2005) is an album by English soprano Sarah Brightman. It contains songs from various shows for which Andrew Lloyd Webber wrote the music. The album contains eight previously released songs along with six new recordings.

Track listing
"Probably on a Thursday"
"The Perfect Year"
"Only You" (with Cliff Richard)
"Love Changes Everything"
"Seeing Is Believing " (with Michael Ball)
"Think of Me" (with Steve Barton)
"Any Dream Will Do" 
"I Don't Know How to Love Him"
"Too Much in Love to Care" (with John Barrowman)
"The Phantom of the Opera" (with Steve Harley)
"Make Up My Heart"
"Don't Cry for Me Argentina" (Spanish Version)
"Everything's Alright" (with Gary Martin & Bogdan Kominowski)
"Whistle Down the Wind" (piano with Andrew Lloyd Webber)

Weekly charts

Notes

References

2005 albums
Sarah Brightman albums
Albums produced by Andrew Lloyd Webber
Albums produced by Nigel Wright